The name Guchol has been used to name three tropical cyclones in the northwestern Pacific Ocean. The name was contributed by the Federated States of Micronesia and is a spice turmeric in the Yapese language.
 Severe Tropical Storm Guchol (T0512, 12W) 
 Typhoon Guchol (2012) (T1204, 05W, Butchoy) – struck Japan.
 Tropical Storm Guchol (2017) (T1717, 19W, Kiko)

Pacific typhoon set index articles